The following is a family tree of the monarchs of Russia.

Rurik dynasty

Romanov dynasty

Gallery

See also
 Bibliography of Russian history (1223–1613)
 Bibliography of Russian history (1613–1917)

External links

Family tree of the House of Romanov

Family trees
Russian monarchy